Speke and Garston Coastal Reserve is a park in south Liverpool, Merseyside, England. It was developed on part of the former site of Liverpool John Lennon Airport.

References

External links
 Speke and Garston Coastal Reserve By Mersey Basin Campaign

Parks and commons in Liverpool